Feimanka (Polish: Fejmanka) - a river (stream) in Latvia (Latgale, Preiļi Municipality), right tributary of the Dubna river.  It flows from Feimaņu ezers, it is  long; it flows through the city of Riebiņi and avoids the city of Preiļi from the north-west (about one and a half kilometers - one mi); main inflow - Preiļupe. It flows into Dubna in the village of Rožupe, about twelve kilometers before its mouth to Daugava.

See also
 Rivers of Europe

External links
 Feimanka in geographic.org
 Feimanka in getamap.net
 Feimanka (as Fejmanka) in Geographical Dictionary of the Kingdom of Poland (in Polish), vol. II, page 378:

Rivers of Latvia